Michael or Mike Boyle may refer to:

 Michael Boyle (bishop of Waterford and Lismore) (1580–1635), Church of Ireland bishop
 Michael Boyle (archbishop of Armagh) (1609–1702), Church of Ireland primate; nephew of the above
 Michael Boyle (footballer) (born 1986/1987), Irish Gaelic goalkeeper
 Michael E. Boyle (born 1965), United States Navy admiral 
 Mike Boyle (1944–2021), mayor of Omaha, Nebraska and member of the Douglas County Board of Commissioners
 Mike Boyle (footballer) (1908–????), English football full back active in the 1930s